Red House Branch is a  long 1st order tributary to Tidbury Creek in Kent County, Delaware.

Course
Red House Branch rises about 0.5 miles northwest of Derby Shores in Kent County, Delaware on the Almshouse Branch divide.  Red House Branch then flows southeast to flow into Derby Pond.

Watershed
Red House Branch drains  of area, receives about 44.8 in/year of precipitation, has a topographic wetness index of 592.32 and is about 6.0% forested.

See also
List of Delaware rivers

Maps

References

Rivers of Delaware
Rivers of Kent County, Delaware